"Theme for an Imaginary Western" is a song written by Jack Bruce and Pete Brown. The song is sometimes referred to as "Theme from an Imaginary Western". It has been performed by many artists, including Mountain, Jack Bruce, Leslie West, Colosseum, Greenslade, DC3 and Johan Asherton.

The song originally appeared on Bruce's Songs for a Tailor album in 1969. The lyrics by Pete Brown are mentioned in Brown's autobiography "White Rooms and Imaginary Westerns" as being in reference to Bruce's erstwhile bandmates Dick Heckstall-Smith and Graham Bond of The Graham Bond Organisation.

The following year, "Theme" appeared on Mountain's Climbing! album. Mountain bassist/vocalist Felix Pappalardi, who sang the song with Mountain, had helped produce Bruce's album and brought the song to guitarist/vocalist Leslie West's attention for their album. Mountain performed the song at the Woodstock Festival in 1969; this version appeared on the Woodstock 2 album.

In 1988, Bruce teamed up with Mountain guitarist Leslie West, and performed the song again on West's Theme album, which was named after the song. West also performed it on Leslie West Live!  and the Howard Stern Show.

References

Mountain (band) songs
1969 songs
Rock ballads
Songs written by Jack Bruce
Song recordings produced by Felix Pappalardi
Songs of the Vietnam War
Songs with lyrics by Pete Brown